The Ming dynasty was the last unified dynasty founded by the Han ethnicity in Chinese history, which lasted for 276 years. The Ming dynasty continued to use the emperor's era name since Emperor Wu of Han to record the year, using a total of 17 era names. Among them, the first era name used was the Hongwu era name, which was inaugurated by Zhu Yuanzhang in 1368, and the last era name was the Chongzhen era name, which was suspended after Zhu Youjian, the Chongzhen Emperor, hanged himself in Meishan during the Jiashen Incident; the longest in use was the Wanli era name, which lasted about 47 years and 7 months, and the shortest was the Taichang era name, which succeeded Wanli for only about 5 months.

After the Jiashen Incident, the Ming imperial clan successively established the Southern Ming regimes in the Jiangnan area. The Ming imperial clan's last regime was eradicated after Zhu Youlang, the Yongli Emperor, was captured and killed. The Kingdom of Tungning, which "followed the Ming dynasty calendar" (奉正朔, fèng zhēng shuò), eventually surrendered to the Qing dynasty. The Southetn Ming used a total of 3 era names, and each of the Southern Ming era names is also listed here.

Most emperors before the Ming dynasty used more than two era names during their reigns, until the yī shì yī yuán zhì (一世一元制; lit. "one-era-name-for-a-lifetime system") was established during the Hongwu Emperor's reign. Later emperors generally used only one era name, so among the people, the era name was used to refer to the emperor himself, but Emperor Yingzong once used two era names. The Ming dynasty era name did not change much, and the use time of the era name was relatively long on average. The change of era began roughly the year after the new emperor ascended the throne, but there were a few special circumstances: for example, after Zhu Di's "Jingnan campaign" succeeded in 1402, the Jianwen era name was abolished in that year and was changed to the year of the Hongwu era name; in 1457, after the "Duomen Coup" (奪門之變, "Storming of the Gates Incident"), the emperor emeritus Zhu Qizhen was restored, and the era was changed to "Tianshun" in that year. It also happened that two edicts to change the era were promulgated in one year. For example, when the Wanli Emperor died in 1620, the Taichang Emperor ascended to the throne, and it was planned to use the Taichang era name next year (1621), but the Taichang Emperor died in the same year. The newly enthroned Tianqi Emperor adopted the opinions of the ministers, used the Taichang era name that year, and changed it to the Tianqi era name next year. Because many of the era names of the Ming dynasty repeated the names of the previous dynasty, some also repeated the era name used by the peasant rebellion armies, so that until the end of the Ming dynasty, some people still joked about this matter.

During the Ming dynasty, outer vassals such as Joseon and the Ryukyu Kingdom also used the Ming dynasty era name. After the Joseon was forced to submit to the Qing dynasty in 1637, it used the Qing calendar (正朔, zhēng shuò) on the surface but secretly followed the Chongzhen era name to express the Joseon's ambition to respect the Ming and oppose the Qing.

Because the interpretations of the Ming emperor's era names were mostly unrecorded in official announcements, the interpretation given by Feng Tianyu (馮天瑜) in Ming Qing nian hao tan wei (明清年號探微) is listed here for reference. The period of use of each era name comes from History of Ming, compiled by Zhang Tingyu, and Nan jiang yi shi (南疆繹史) written by Wen Ruilin (溫睿臨).

List

Southern Ming era names

See also
 Ming dynasty
 Southern Ming
 Kingdom of Tungning
 List of Chinese era names

Notes

References

Bibliography

External links
 

Ming dynasty